Anne Marie Astin is an Australian biochemist and forensic expert. She was added to the Victorian Honour Roll of Women in 2010 and received a Public Service Medal in the 2011 Queen's Birthday Honours (Australia). Astin is notable for her role in dairy development and regulation, and her advocacy work regarding food safety standards.

Education 
Astin was born in Durham, England. She received a Ph.D. in Biochemistry in 1976, an Honors Bachelor of Science in Biochemistry and a Bachelor of Science in Chemistry and Biochemistry in 1973, all at the University of Liverpool. She later received a certificate from Griffith University (Queensland) for Public Sector Management.

Early career
Astin was encouraged to enter this field of work by her mother, who pushed her to pursue nontraditional female roles. She began her career teaching at Monash University (Victoria). Afterwards, she became a forensic expert, focusing on police, and later joined the dairy industry. She became the CEO of the Dairy Food Safety Authority in the Government of Victoria.

Career
Astin is the president of the Australian Institute of Food Science and Technology, the Chair of the William Angliss Institute Board  and is the Chair of the Food, Beverage and Pharmaceutical Industry Reference Committee

References 

Australian biochemists
Australian forensic scientists
Women biochemists
Australian women chemists
Year of birth missing (living people)
Living people
Australian women academics
Academic staff of Monash University
21st-century Australian women scientists
21st-century chemists
21st-century women scientists
Alumni of the University of Liverpool